En Magal is a 1954 Indian Tamil-language film directed by K. V. R. Acharya and M. K. R. Nambiar. The film stars Ranjan, M. N. Nambiar and S. Varalakshmi.

Plot
Raghu is a son of a zamindar. He likes to be independent from his father but he had to marry Vasantha, a mirasudar's daughter as per his father's wish. But he makes life a hell for Vasantha. He sets his eyes on Vasantha's friend Mallika. But Mallika is already in love with Balu and they both get married. However, Raghu is not deterred by their marriage and continue to overture Mallika. In the meantime Raghu also tries to seduce a dancer, Ranjana. She does not fall for him but tries to correct his ways. One day Raghu kidnaps Mallika. Her husband Balu and his friend goes to save her. In the ensuing fight a knife thrown by Mallika injures Raghu seriously. He is admitted to a hospital. On hearing that her husband is admitted to hospital, Vasantha goes there. She meets her friend Mallika and learns what has happened. How everything is solved forms the rest of the story.

Cast
List adapted from The Hindu review article.

Male cast
Ranjan as Raghu
M. N. Nambiar as Balu
M. G. Chakrapani as Mirasudar
D. Balasubramaniam as Zamindar
Appa K. Duraiswamy
A. Karunanidhi
Stunt Somu as Balu's friend
Female cast
S. Varalakshmi as Vasantha
Mynavathi as Mallika
Bombay Meenakshi as Ranjana
K. S. Rajam
M. D. Krishna Bai
Kanakam

Production
The film was directed by K. V. R. Acharya and M. K. R. Nambiar under the supervision of senior director and filmmaker Raja Chandrasekhar.

Soundtrack
Music was composed by C. N. Pandurangan while the lyrics were penned by Bharathidasan and Pavalar Salem N. Velayuthasami. Singers are S. Varalakshmi and K. S. Rajam. Playback singers are A. M. Rajah, A. P. Komala, (Radha) Jayalakshmi,  Sathyawathi and T. M. Soundararajan.

References

Indian drama films
1950s Tamil-language films
Films scored by C. N. Pandurangan
1954 drama films